Glyphodes microta is a moth of the family Crambidae. It is found in Australia, where it ranges from the east coast to the west coast across the middle of the continent.

The wingspan is about 20 mm. Adults are brown with a white pattern.

The larvae feed on Apocynaceae species. They have been recorded feeding in a web on the flower heads of Parsonsia eucalyptophylla as well as inside the leaves of Hoya australis.

References

Moths described in 1889
Glyphodes